{{DISPLAYTITLE:Prostaglandin H2}}

Prostaglandin H2 is a type of prostaglandin and a precursor for many other biologically significant molecules. It is synthesized from arachidonic acid in a reaction catalyzed by a cyclooxygenase enzyme. The conversion from Arachidonic acid to Prostaglandin H2 is a two step process. First, COX-1 catalyzes the addition of two free oxygens to form the 1,2-Dioxane bridge and a peroxide functional group to form Prostaglandin G2. Second, COX-2 reduces the peroxide functional group to a Secondary alcohol, forming Prostaglandin H2. Other peroxidases like Hydroquinone have been observed to reduce PGG2 to PGH2. PGH2 is unstable at room temperature, with a half life of 90-100 seconds, so it is often converted into a different prostaglandin.

It is acted upon by:
 Prostacyclin synthase to create prostacyclin
 Thromboxane-A synthase to create thromboxane A2 and 12-(S)-hydroxy-5Z,8E,10E-heptadecatrienoic acid (HHT) (see 12-Hydroxyheptadecatrienoic acid)
 Prostaglandin D2 synthase to create prostaglandin D2
 Prostaglandin E synthase to create prostaglandin E2

It rearranges non-enzymatically to:
 A mixture of 12-(S)-hydroxy-5Z,8E,10E-heptadecatrienoic acid (HHT) and 12-(S)-hydroxy-5Z,8Z,10E-heptadecatrienoic acid (see 12-Hydroxyheptadecatrienoic acid)

Use of prostaglandin H2:
 regulating the constriction and dilation of blood vessels
 stimulating platelet aggregation
binds to Thromboxane receptor on platelets' cell membranes to trigger platelet migration and adhesion to other platelets.

Effects of Aspirin on prostaglandin H2:
 Aspirin has been hypothesized to block the conversion of arachidonic acid to prostaglandin

References 

Organic peroxides
Prostaglandins